Morcourt may refer to the following places in France:

 Morcourt, Aisne, a commune in the department of Aisne
 Morcourt, Somme, a commune in the department of Somme